The 2010 season was Molde's 3rd consecutive year in Tippeligaen, and their 34th season in the top flight of Norwegian football. They competed in Tippeligaen where they finished in 11th position, the Norwegian Cup where they were knocked out in the third round and the UEFA Europa League where they were knocked by Stuttgart in the third qualifying round. Head coach Kjell Jonevret was sacked on 30 August, with the club positioned in 14th place and in danger of being relegated, and was replaced by Uwe Rösler which saved the club from relegation with six wins and two draws in the last eight matches.

Transfers

In

Out

Loan in

Loan out

Competitions

Tippeligaen

Results summary

Results by round

Fixtures & results

League table

Norwegian Cup

UEFA Europa League

Second qualifying round

Third qualifying round

Squad statistics

Appearances and goals

|-
|colspan="14"|Players who appeared for Molde but left the club before the end of the season:

|}

Goal Scorers

See also
Molde FK seasons

References 

2010
Molde
Molde